Ahn Hyo-seop (born April 17, 1995) or Paul Ahn, is a Canadian actor and singer based in South Korea. He gained recognition for his main roles in the Korean dramas Still 17 (2018), Abyss (2019), Dr. Romantic 2 (2020), Lovers of the Red Sky (2021), and  Business Proposal (2022).

Early life
Ahn was born on April 17, 1995 in Seoul, South Korea as the third of 4 siblings. When he was seven years old, his family immigrated to Toronto, Canada. Ahn later moved back to South Korea when he was 17, while his family stayed in Canada. He later attended and graduated from Kookmin University, in the Department of International Business.

Career 
After moving back to South Korea, Ahn was scouted by JYP Entertainment and became a trainee. He was given an opportunity to debut as a member in the K-pop boy band Got7. However, he ultimately turned down the offer to pursue other endeavors.

2015–2016: Debut with One O One, acting debut and career beginnings
On October 1, 2015, Starhaus Entertainment launched the project group One O One, releasing their debut single "Love You". The group consisted of Ahn together with fellow Starhaus actors Kwak Si-yang, Song Won-seok and Kwon Do-kyun. However, the group presumably disbanded due to inactivity since January 2019.

Ahn made his acting debut in the MBC drama, Splash Splash Love. He then became a cast member of the music variety show Always Cantare. He had supporting roles in One More Happy Ending, Happy Home and Entertainer in 2016.

2017–present: Transition to lead roles

His popularity rose after his first ever lead role in Queen of the Ring and My Father is Strange in 2017. He then transitioned to lead roles thereafter.

In 2018, Ahn starred in Still 17, playing passionate high school student Yoo Chan – the captain of the high school rowing club.  For his performance, he won Best New Actor Award and was nominated for the "Character of the Year" Award at the 2018 SBS Drama Awards alongside Jo Hyun-sik and Lee Do-hyun And later in the same year, Ahn acted in the drama Top Management which aired on YouTube Red.

In 2019, Ahn starred alongside Park Bo-young in the romantic comedy fantasy crime drama Abyss, where he played rich yet unattractive heir to a cosmetics empire who transforms into a handsome young man as he is revived by a mysterious orb after his death. In late 2019, Ahn became an MC at the 4th Asia Artist Awards with Leeteuk, Lim Ji-yeon and Nancy.

In 2020, Ahn starred in the second season of the hit medical drama Dr. Romantic, playing general surgeon Seo Woo-jin with Lee Sung-kyung as his leading lady. The show was a success, with both Ahn and Lee keeping their promise of singing for the fans as it crossed the double-digit mark for ratings. His performance in the drama earned him the Best New Actor Award in television at the 56th Baeksang Arts Awards. He also received Excellence Award, Actor in a Miniseries Action/Genre Drama at 2020 SBS Drama Awards.

In 2021, Ahn starred in the historical-fantasy drama Lovers of the Red Sky adapted from the novel written by Jung Eun-gwol, playing the role of Ha Ram, a blind astrologer who reads the stars, while living a disguised life as Ilwolseong – chief of an information organisation and whose body is possessed by Ma Wang (the Demon King) since childhood, alongside Kim Yoo-jung as Hong Cheon-gi, a female painter. For his portrayal of multiple roles as Ha Ram, Ilwolseong and Ma Wang, he received Excellence Award, Actor in a Miniseries Genre/Fantasy Drama and won Best Couple Award with Kim Yoo-jung at 2021 SBS Drama Awards.

In 2022, Ahn starred in the SBS-broadcast and Netflix-distributed romantic comedy drama Business Proposal adapted from the webtoon with the same title, with Kim Se-jeong. He played the role of Kang Tae-mu, a third generation chaebol and CEO. In March 2022, he was cast in the Netflix series A Time Called You, South Korean adaptation of the Taiwanese drama Someday Or One Day. In May 2022, Ahn signed with The Present Co., the agency he co-founded with a manager who worked with him before his debut.

Philanthropy 
On August 16, 2022, Ahn donated  to help those affected by the 2022 South Korean floods through the Hope Bridge Korea Disaster Relief Association.

Filmography

Television series

Web series

Television show

Hosting

Discography

Awards and nominations

Listicles

References

External links

 
 

1995 births
Living people
South Korean male pop singers
South Korean male television actors
South Korean male web series actors
21st-century South Korean male actors
21st-century South Korean  male singers
South Korean emigrants to Canada
Naturalized citizens of Canada
Canadian male television actors
Best New Actor Paeksang Arts Award (television) winners